SIGAL UNIQA Group AUSTRIA is a group of seven insurance companies and one private pension fund that operate in Albania, Kosovo and North Macedonia.

The following companies are part of the SIGAL Group: SIGAL UNIQA Group AUSTRIA (Non-Life, Albania), SIGAL Life UNIQA Group AUSTRIA (Life, Albania), SIGAL UNIQA Group AUSTRIA Kosovo (Non-Life, Kosovo), SIGAL Life UNIQA Group AUSTRIA Kosovo (Life, Kosovo), UNIQA Skopje (Non-Life, North Macedonia), UNIQA Life Skopje (Life, North Macedonia), SIGAL UNIQA Group AUSTRIA Reinsurance and the Management Company of Private Pension Fund SIGAL Life UNIQA Group AUSTRIA.

SIGAL UNIQA was founded in 1999 and leads the Albanian insurance market for both non-life and life insurances and well as for private pensions as it holds overall more than 30% of the market.

SIGAL UNIQA was the first insurance company in Albania that attracted foreign investments. In October 2003, the Albanian-American Fund of Enterprise became the first shareholder of SIGAL by acquiring 13.3% of shares. Thanks to this agreement, A.A.E.F provided financial and management support not only to SIGAL, but also to the entire insurance market in Albania and in the region where it operates.

Since March 2007, SIGAL has been part of the UNIQA Group AUSTRIA. The company operates in 21 European countries and is one of the biggest financial groups in Europe. The company was awarded with an "A" by "Standard & Poor's", with 24.6 Billion Euro under its management and more than 7.5 Million clients. UNIQA Group AUSTRIA is the biggest stakeholder of SIGAL UNIQA Group AUSTRIA as it holds 68.64% of shares. Based on this, more than 80% of SIGAL UNIQA's capital derives from foreign investments.

Internationally, the SIGAL UNIQA Group AUSTRIA has been continually awarded by Finance Central Europe as "The Best Insurance Company in Albania". SEE News listed SIGAL UNIQA among the top insurance companies in the region and Business Initiative Directions awarded SIGAL UNIQA with the "International Star for Quality", a vanity award.

References

Financial services companies established in 1999
Insurance companies of Albania
Albanian brands
1999 establishments in Albania